Viereck is a city in Mecklenburg-Vorpommern, Germany.

Viereck may also refer to:
 Viereck's skipper (Atrytonopsis vierecki), a butterfly in the family Hesperiidae

People with the surname
 George Sylvester Viereck (1884–1962), German-American poet, writer and pro-Nazi propagandist
 Henry Lorenz Viereck (1881–1931), American entomologist who specialised in Hymenoptera
 Peter Viereck (1916–2006), American poet

See also
 Verecke, a mountain pass in Ukraine